Natalie Medlock (born 15 October 1986) is a British-born New Zealand actress and writer best known for her role in Shortland Street as nurse Jill Kingsbury which she played from 3 February 2011 to 16 January 2012.

Biography 
Medlock was born and raised in Plymouth, until her parents moved to New Zealand in 1999 with her sister Kate Medlock. The family settled on a drystock farm in Te Puke's Maniatutu Rd. Medlock threw herself into schoolwork, horse riding, piano and performing arts, her teacher inspired and mentored her in stage work. After finishing Year 13, Medlock went to Toi Whaakari: New Zealand Drama School, where she graduated with a Bachelor of Performing Arts (Acting) in 2007. Her big break came with Shortland Street. Despite only being a year on the long running soap the tragic death of the character saddened fans. Medlock also wrote an episode of the soap.

Personal life
Since 2011 Medlock is in a relationship with former Shortland Street alumni, Robbie Magasiva, the couple divides their time between Australia and New Zealand. 
They first met in 2009 doing a play called "Christ Almighty!"
 Medlock recalls it was her costume that earned Magasiva's heart  
In 2015 the pair went on stage again with Christ Almighty with the Wentworth cast  to raise money for the homeless. The couple attributes love and therapy for their long-term relationship.

Medlock revealed she suffers from anxiety and depression the actress and director opened up about its ups and downs and how she had to rely on Magasiva with her family being away in England.
After her mental health improved with therapy, medication and support of Magasiva, it inspired her to do a new play called "Near Death Experience" in 2018.

Filmography

Film
2007 – Bad Trip (Short) as English Girl
2006 – Wrapped (Short) as Anushka le Coq
2016 – The Ex Men as Mary Johnson
2019 – The Other Side of Heaven 2: Fire of Faith (2019) as Jean Groberg
2021 – There’s no ‘I’ in Threesome as Zoe
2022 - ‘’Nude Tuesday’’

TV work
 2009 – Diplomatic Immunity Grace
 2010 – Feedback – Natalie
 2011–12 – Shortland Street – Jill Kingsbury
 2012 – Auckland Daze – Natalie
 2012 – The Almighty Johnsons – Natalie
 2014 – It's a Date – Karen
 2014 – Timothy – nurse
 2015 – Funny Girls 
 2015 – The Yeti Show (Web Series)
 2016 – The Video Store – customer
 2016 – Our NZ Escape – presenter
 2016 – 1953 – London Reporter
 2018 – Roman Empire: Julius Caesar - Master of Rome – Servilia

References

New Zealand film actresses
1986 births
Living people
New Zealand television actresses
New Zealand soap opera actresses
21st-century New Zealand actresses
Toi Whakaari alumni